Sardar Krishnama Naidu is a 1987 Indian-language Telugu action drama film written and directed by A. Kodandarami Reddy starring Krishna in dual roles alongside Sarada and Vijayashanti, produced by B. H. Ajay Kumar for Bala Balaji Productions with a musical score by Chakravarthy. Released on 11 June, the film marked the last collaboration of Krishna with Reddy.

Cast 
 Krishna
 Vijayashanti
 Sarada
 Rao Gopala Rao
 Kaikala Satyanarayana
 Ravi Kondala Rao
 Chalapati Rao
 Annapurna

Soundtrack 

Chakravarthy scored and composed the film's soundtrack.

References

External links 
 Sardar Krishnama Naidu on Twitter

1987 films
Indian action drama films
Films directed by A. Kodandarami Reddy
Films scored by K. Chakravarthy
1980s action drama films
1980s Telugu-language films